Yuri Alexandrov may refer to:

Yuri Alexandrov (boxer) (1963–2013), Russian boxer
Yuri Alexandrov (director) (born 1950), Russian opera director
Yuri Alexandrov (ice hockey) (born 1988), Russian ice hockey player